Galesville is an unincorporated community in Sangamon Township, Piatt County, Illinois, United States.

Geography

References

Unincorporated communities in Piatt County, Illinois
Unincorporated communities in Illinois